Janitors Of Tomorrow is the debut full-length album released by the band Gas Huffer in 1991.

Track listing 
  "Nisqually"
  "Shoe Factory"
  "Night Train To Spokane"
  "Going To Las Vegas"
  "Dangerous Drifter"
  "Robert"
  "Mistake"
  "All That Guff"
  "Lizard Hunt"
  "Insidious"
  "Love Comes Creeping"
  "Compromise In The Dark"
  "Girl I Need Your Lovin' (Right Now)"
  "Want To Kiss You"
  "Eat You Whole"
  "Buck Naked"
  "Mouthful"
  "Firebug"
  "Jesus Was My Only Friend"

References 

Gas Huffer albums
1991 debut albums
Albums produced by Jack Endino
Works about janitors